"Breezeblocks" is a song by British indie rock band alt-J from their debut studio album An Awesome Wave (2012). The song was released on 18 May 2012 as the album's second single. The song was written by Joe Newman, Gus Unger-Hamilton, Gwil Sainsbury, Thom Green and produced by Charlie Andrew. It reached the top ten in the UK Indie and US Alternative charts, and was voted into third place in Australian radio station Triple J's Hottest 100 of 2012, behind "Thrift Shop" and "Little Talks".

The band was formed at Leeds University in 2007. Newman (vocalist) and Sainsbury (guitarist) started recording their songs on Garage Band and were soon joined by Unger-Hamilton and Green. They later coined the band name, alt-j.

The sinister love song is about liking someone that you want so much to love you that you want to hurt yourself and them. alt-j stated in an interview that Breezeblocks, as well as the rest of the album An Awesome Wave, was related to the idea of the children's book, Where the Wild Things Are.

Songwriting
The song contains multiple references to the children's book Where the Wild Things Are by Maurice Sendak. Newman sings, "Do you know where the wild things go?" In addition, the repeated refrain at the end of the song is a modified version of a portion of the book. Breezeblocks' lyrics are "Please don't go, I'll eat you whole / I love you so". Sendak's words are "Oh, please don't go  — we'll eat you up — we love you so!".

The song is about a man who's in love with a partner that wishes to leave him, and in response, the man resorts to violent outbursts and threats to force the two to remain together, with implications that the ending lyrics of "please don't go, I'll eat you whole, I love you so" is supposed to mean said partner is murdered, as per the cannibalism metaphor from Where the Wild Things Are. Writing for the song started when Joe Newman read a warning label on an aerosol can which said the can "may contain traces of something that may be flammable", to which Newman translated into the repeated leitmotif of "she may contain the urge to run away"

Music video
A music video was created to accompany the release of the song. Directed by Ellis Bahl and starring actors Jonathan Dwyer, Jessica DiGiovanni, and Eleanor Pienta, it is the band's first official music video.

The song and its music video seem to convey very different messages, with the song being about a deranged, obsessive man, whilst the music video shows a murderous and presumably vengeful ex-girlfriend. In an interview with Interview magazine, Joe Newman states "Our video for this track has a really different message, and yet it worked really well with the song. It's quite a weird one; people aren't sure what's going on. We liked that you might have to go back and watch it a second time to figure out what is happening" 

The video features a violent fight in an apartment between a male and a female character shown in reverse, beginning with the death of the female character at the hands of the male character, who bludgeons her with a breeze block. As the fight progresses backwards, it is revealed that the female character is the aggressor in the fight, having ambushed the male character as he returned home to discover his wife  bound and gagged.

The video aired for the first time on YouTube on 23 March 2012. As of February 2022, it has over 237 million views. The video won at the UK Music Video Awards for "Best Alternative Video" on 8 November 2012.

Track listing
7" single
"Breezeblocks" – 3:47
Tom Vek's Remix – 3:59

Digital download – single
"Breezeblocks" – 3:47

Digital download – remixes
"Breezeblocks" – 3:47
Tom Vek's Remix – 5:18
B-Ju Remix – 3:59
Rockdaworld Remix – 4:41

Credits and personnel
Lead vocals – Alt-J (∆)
Producers – Charlie Andrew
Lyrics – Joe Newman, Gus Unger-Hamilton, Gwilym Sainsbury, Thom Green

Chart performance

Weekly charts

Year-end charts

Certifications

Radio and release history

References

External links
 

2012 singles
Alt-J songs
Experimental rock songs
2012 songs
Songs written by Thom Sonny Green